This is a list of members of the Presidency of Bosnia and Herzegovina since the country declared independence on 1 March 1992, ranked by the length of their combined terms in office.

To date, a total of 41 individuals have held office as members of the Presidency of Bosnia and Herzegovina, which has consisted of three members (one Bosniak, one Serb and one Croat) since 1996. From 1992 until the signing of the Dayton Agreement (which brought to an end the Bosnian War) the Presidency comprised seven members (two each for Bosniaks, Serbs and Croats and one member for "Others"); in addition due to the war taking place from 1992 until 1995 (and thus the existence of a state of imminent peril for the nation) three additional members were included in the membership of the Presidency: the Speaker of the Assembly, the Prime Minister and the Commander of the TORBiH General Headquarters (later the Commander of the TORBiH Staff, Chief of the ARBiH General Staff and Commander of the ARBiH Supreme Command Staff).

Five individuals have served non-consecutive terms as members of the Presidency: Stjepan Kljuić (both times as one of two Croat members), Momčilo Krajišnik (first as an additional member as the Speaker of the Parliamentary Assembly, and later as the Serb member), Haris Silajdžić (first as an additional member as Prime Minister, and later as the Bosniak member), Dragan Čović (both times as the Croat member) and Željko Komšić (both times as the Croat member).

Members of the Presidency

Political parties: 
 (8)
 (7)
 (1)
 (3)
 (10)
 (2)
 (1)
 (1)
 (2)
 (5)
 (4)

See also
Chairman of the Presidency of Bosnia and Herzegovina
List of members of the Presidency of Bosnia and Herzegovina 
Chairman of the Council of Ministers of Bosnia and Herzegovina
Parliamentary Assembly of Bosnia and Herzegovina

Bibliography
Šimić, Tomo (2006) Dokumenti predsjedništva Bosne i Hercegovine 1991.–1994. National security and the future, 8(3):9-227 (in Bosnian, Croatian and Serbian)

References

External links
predsjednistvobih.ba in 

Lists of people by time in office
Bosnia and Herzegovina politics-related lists